Avenida da Liberdade (Portuguese for "Avenue of Liberty") is a boulevard in central Lisbon, Portugal, is the most expensive street to rent or buy property on in Portugal. Originating in the Passeio Público, an 18th-century park built for the Portuguese nobility, the avenue was built in 1879, when the former park was turned into a major boulevard, marking the northward expansion of the city during the 19th century. The Avenida is also home to numerous embassies and diplomatic missions.

The Avenida is a 90-metre-wide boulevard, 1100 m long, with ten lanes divided by pedestrian pavements and gardens. It links Marquis of Pombal Square in the north to Restauradores Square, the entrance to the Lisbon Baixa. It is commonly referred to by the inhabitants of Lisbon simply as the "Avenida" (the Avenue).

History

The Avenida da Liberdade, as well as the Restauradores Square, have their origins in a public park (Passeio Público) inaugurated in the area in 1764. Projected by Pombaline architect Reinaldo Manuel, the park was initially surrounded by a high wall. It was revamped in the 1830s and 1840s by architect Malaquias Ferreira Leal, who introduced a new arrangement of the flora as well as fountains, a waterfall and statues. The allegoric statues representing the Tagus and Douro rivers still existing in the boulevard of the Avenue date from this time.

The Avenue was built between 1879 and 1886, modelled after the boulevards of Paris. Its creation was a landmark in the Northwards expansion of the city, and it quickly became a preferred address for the upper class. The Avenue was planned to expand further north, through what is the present central lawn lane of the Eduardo VII Park. However, these plans were abandoned in the 1960s.

Many of the original buildings of the Avenue have been demolished in the last decades and replaced by modern office and hotel buildings. Nowadays, it boasts several interesting buildings that reflect Portuguese architecture from the late 19th through the early 21st centuries. Its pedestrian sidewalks and roundabouts, paved with the traditional Portuguese pavement, are decorated with many monuments and statues that pay homage to important personalities like Almeida Garrett, Alexandre Herculano and others. The large monument to the fallen in World War I, inaugurated in 1931, is the work of Rebelo de Andrade and Maximiano Alves.

Luxury destination

Avenida da Liberdade's central location and proximity to the prestigious locations and institutions, like the Chiado district, Marquis of Pombal Square, Queen Maria II National Theatre, the Avenidas Novas, Eduardo VII Park, the Lisbon Baixa, and numerous others, the avenue has long been considered the heart of Lisbon and its most prestigious address. It has become an international luxury destination for its shopping, hotels, and fine dining.

The avenue is home to one of the largest concentration of international luxury brands in Europe, including brands like Louis Vuitton, Prada, Christian Dior, Chanel, Versace, Balmain, Gucci, Givenchy, Yves Saint Laurent, Stella McCartney, Christian Louboutin, Dolce & Gabbana, Armani, Tod's, Ermenegildo Zegna, Burberry.

The Avenida is home to numerous luxury hotels, including those from the following groups: Sofitel, Tivoli Hotels & Resorts, Dom Pedro Hotels & Golf Collection, and Fontecruz Hotels, among numerous others.

Transportation
The Avenida is a major artery road in central Lisbon, connecting the Avenidas Novas to the Lisbon Baixa, Chiado, Bairro Alto, and more.

There are three Lisbon Metro stations along the avenue:
 Restauradores (Lisbon Metro) at the southeast end, served by the blue line.
 Avenida (Lisbon Metro) at about the midpoint of the avenue, served by the blue line.
 Marquês de Pombal (Lisbon Metro) at the northwest end (close to a giant roundabout with 4 lanes), served by the blue and yellow lines.

Gallery

References
Avenida da Liberdade in the Portuguese Institute for Architectonic Heritage.

External links
Avenida da Liberdade Designer Shops and Their Addresses

Streets in Lisbon
Shopping districts and streets